Sweatbees is a compilation album by Louisville, Kentucky rock band My Morning Jacket. It was released as a five-track EP in the UK on the Wichita label in 2002 and a nine-track compilation in Australia on the Spunk label in 2003. On both versions it comprised tracks from the band's second album At Dawn and two EPs.

Track listing

UK release
(All tracks by Jim James)
 "Lowdown" – 3:56 (originally on At Dawn)
 "The Way That He Sings" – 5:37 (originally on At Dawn)
 "O is the One That Is Real" – 3:40 (originally on My Morning Jacket/Songs: Ohia Split EP)
 "Come Closer" – 4:57 (originally on My Morning Jacket/Songs: Ohia Split EP)
 "Sooner" – 3:41 (originally on Chocolate and Ice)

Australian release
(All tracks by Jim James)
 "Lowdown" – 3:56 
 "The Way That He Sings" – 5:37 
 "O is the One That Is Real" – 3:40 
 "Come Closer" – 4:57 
 "Sooner" – 3:41 
 "Sweetheart" – 3:07 (originally on Chocolate and Ice)
 "Can You See the Hard Helmet on My Head?" – 3:46 (originally on Chocolate and Ice)
 "Death is the Easy Way" – 5:30 (originally on At Dawn)
 "How Do You Know" – 4:49 (originally on My Morning Jacket/Songs: Ohia Split EP)

Personnel 
 Jim James - guitar
 Danny Cash - keyboards
 Patrick Hallahan - drums
 Johnny Quaid – guitar
 Two-Tone Tommy – bass

References

My Morning Jacket compilation albums
2002 compilation albums
Albums produced by Jim James